Barbara Craft (November 23, 1942) is a Republican former member of the Kansas House of Representatives, representing the 65th district.  She served from 2003 to 2011.

Prior to her election to the House, Craft served on the Unified School District 475 Board of Education from 1987 to 2003.  She has worked as owner/manager of Craft's Prescription Pharmacy and was director of the blood bank and Irwin Army Hospital.

Craft is currently a member of the Geary County Republican Women, Kansas for a Strong Fort Riley (KFSFR), Kansans Committee Old Trooper Regiment, Incorporated, Women's Connection, and the Junction City Chamber of Commerce.

Committee membership
 Appropriations
 Vision 2020
 Veterans, Military and Homeland Security
 Education Budget
 Joint Committee on Corrections and Juvenile Justice Oversight

Major donors
The top 5 donors to Craft's 2008 campaign are mostly professional organizations:
1. Kansas Dental Assoc 	$1,000
2. Kansas Medical Society 	$1,000
3. Kansas Contractors Assoc 	$1,000
4. Greater Kansas City Chamber of Commerce 	$750
5. Kansas Livestock Assoc 	$750

References

External links
 Kansas Legislature - Barbara Craft
 Project Vote Smart profile
 Kansas Votes profile
 State Surge - Legislative and voting track record
 Campaign contributions: 2002, 2004, 2006, 2008

Republican Party members of the Kansas House of Representatives
Living people
Women state legislators in Kansas
1942 births
21st-century American women politicians
21st-century American politicians